Pahi, or Lugitama (also Riahoma, Wansum), is a Sepik language of Sandaun Province, Papua-New Guinea.

References

Tama languages
Languages of Sandaun Province